The Rhyacian Period (meaning "stream of lava") is the second geologic period in the Paleoproterozoic Era and lasted from  Mya to  Mya (million years ago). Instead of being based on stratigraphy, these dates are defined chronometrically.

The Bushveld Igneous Complex and some other similar intrusions formed during this period.

The Huronian (Makganyene) global glaciation began at the start of the Rhyacian and lasted 100 million years. It lasted about 80% of this period.

For the time interval from 2250 Ma to 2060 Ma, an alternative period based on stratigraphy rather than chronometry, named either the Jatulian or the Eukaryian, was suggested in the geological timescale review 2012 edited by Gradstein et al., but , this has not yet been officially adopted by the IUGS. The term Jatulian is, however, used in the regional stratigraphy of the Paleoproterozoic rocks of Fennoscandia.

This is when the eukaryotes are thought to have originated from the symbiosis between asgardarchaea and alphaproteobacteria, as well as the sexual reproduction found within the eukaryotes only, thus the alternative name Eukaryian.

References 

Paleoproterozoic
Geological periods
Proterozoic geochronology